Marcus Olaus Bockman (January 9, 1849 – July 21, 1942) was a Norwegian-American Lutheran theologian.

Background
Marcus Olaus Bockman was born Marcus Olaus Bøckmann at Langesund in Bamble  municipality, Telemark county, Norway. He was educated at Egersund High School, Aars and Voss Latin School, and the University of Christiania (Oslo). After graduating as a Candidatus theologiæ, he was ordained as a priest of the Church of Norway.

Career
Bockman immigrated to the United States in 1875. He served as a Lutheran pastor near Kenyon, Minnesota at Gol Lutheran Church from 1875 to 1880 and at Moland Lutheran Church from 1880 to 1888.  Having first worked as a Lutheran pastor for several years, he was appointed as a Professor  of Theology at the Luther Theological Seminary operated by the Norwegian Synod in Saint Paul, Minnesota in 1886–90. He taught at Augsburg Seminary in Minneapolis, Minnesota from 1890 to 1893. He was President of the United Church Seminary operated by the United Norwegian Lutheran Church in  Saint Paul, Minnesota from 1893–1917. He was made a Knight 1st class of the Royal Norwegian Order of St. Olav by King Haakon VII of Norway in 1912. His official portrait in the reading room of the library of Luther Theological Seminary depicts him wearing the Knight's Cross of the Order on his Norwegian clerical cassock.

From 1917 to 1930 he served as the president of the Luther Theological Seminary. From 1930 until his retirement in 1937, he continued to serve as a professor at the Seminary. He died in 1942 after suffering a broken hip. The personal records and files of Marcus O. Bockman are contained within the archives of Luther Seminary.

References

External links
  Gol Lutheran Church - Kenyon, MN

1849 births
1942 deaths
People from Bamble
Norwegian theologians
Norwegian emigrants to the United States
20th-century American Lutheran clergy
University of Oslo alumni
19th-century Protestant theologians
20th-century Protestant theologians
Recipients of the St. Olav's Medal
19th-century American Lutheran clergy